Nurul Syafiqah Hashim (born 1 January 1994 in Pahang, Malaysia) is a Malaysian archer. She competed in the individual event at the 2012 Summer Olympics.

References 

Malaysian female archers
1994 births
People from Pahang
Malaysian people of Malay descent
Living people
Archers at the 2012 Summer Olympics
Olympic archers of Malaysia